In the 2016–17 season, MC Alger competed in the Ligue 1 for the 46th season, as well as the Algerian Cup, Super Cup and the Confederation Cup.

Pre-season

Competitions

Overview

Ligue 1

League table

Results summary

Results by round

Matches

Algerian Super Cup

Algerian Cup

CAF Confederation Cup

Preliminary round

First round

Play-off round

group stage

Squad information

Playing statistics

|-

|-
! colspan=14 style=background:#dcdcdc; text-align:center| Players transferred out during the season

Goalscorers

Squad list

Transfers

In

Out

References

2016-17
MC Alger